The Coalition was an electoral alliance in Puerto Rico.

The Coalition was formed in 1924, composed of Partido Republicano Puro and the Socialist Party. It was generally in favor of statehood. Some critics thought it represented the interests of United States sugar corporations. It held a majority in the island's legislature from 1932 to 1940.

 

Defunct political parties in Puerto Rico
Political parties established in 1924